Nationalist Social Democrat Party (in Spanish: Partido Social Demócrata Nacionalista) was a political party in Peru founded in 1968 by a dissident fraction of general Manuel A. Odría's Unión Nacional Odriísta. PSDN was led by Julio de la Piedra.

Political parties established in 1968
Defunct political parties in Peru